Aloysia dodsoniorum is a species of flowering plant in the verbena family, Verbenaceae, that is endemic to Ecuador.  Its natural habitat is tropical dry forests.

References

dodsoniorum
Endemic flora of Ecuador
Endangered plants
Taxonomy articles created by Polbot